Thmuis was a city in Lower Egypt, located on the canal east of the Nile, between its Tanitic and Mendesian branches. Its ruins are near the modern city of Timayy al-Imdid.

History

During the Ptolemaic period, Thmuis succeeded Djedet as the capital of Lower Egypt's 16th nome of Kha (Herodotus (II, 166)). The two cities are only several hundred meters apart. Ptolemy also states that the city was the capital of the Mendesian nome. From the Ptolemaic-Roman period are preserved the foundations of a temple.

Thmuis was an episcopal see in the Roman province of Augustamnica Prima, suffragan of Pelusium. Today it is part of the Coptic Holy Metropolitanate of Beheira (Thmuis & Hermopolis Parva), Mariout  (Mariotis), Marsa Matruh (Antiphrae & Paractorium), Libya (Livis) and Pentapolis (Cyrenaica).

In the fourth century it was still an important Roman city, having its own administration and being exempt from the jurisdiction of the Prefect of Alexandria. It was in existence at the time of the Muslim invasion of Egypt in 642 AD, and was later called Al-Mourad or "Al-Mouradeh"; it must have disappeared after the Ottoman conquest of Egypt.

Its ruins are at Tell El-Timai, about five miles north-west of Sinbellawein, a station on the railway from Zagazig to Mansourah in the central Delta.

Bishopric
Le Quien (Oriens christianus, II, 537) names nine bishops of Thmuis, the last three being Monophysites of the Middle Ages. The others are:
 
 Ammonius, Bishop of Thmuis, deposed by Heraclas of Alexandria (d. 247) 
Phileas of Thmuis, d. 306 (in the Martyrology, 4 February), martyr and saint 
Saint Donatus, his successor, martyr
Liberius (not Caius), at the First Council of Nicaea in 325
Saint Serapion of Thmuis, died shortly before 360, the author of various works, in part preserved, a friend of St. Athanasius
Ptolemæus at the Council of Seleucia (359)
Aristobulus, at the First Council of Ephesus (431).

See also 
List of ancient Egyptian sites, including sites of temples
Serapion Bishop of Thmuis

References

Sources 

Baines & Malek "Cultural Atlas of Ancient Egypt", 2000. 
M.I. Bakr & H. Brandl, "Various Sites in the Eastern Nile Delta: Thmuis", in: M.I. Bakr and H. Brandl, with F. Kalloniatis (eds.), Egyptian Antiquities from the Eastern Nile Delta. Museums in the Nile Delta, vol. 2. Cairo/Berlin 2014, pp. 79, 294-301. .

Ptolemaic colonies
Roman sites in Egypt
Catholic titular sees in Africa
Former populated places in Egypt
Nile Delta
Tells (archaeology)